Estrada is a Spanish surname and Portuguese term. Notable people with the surname include:

Armando Estrada, actually Hazem Ali, professional wrestler
Arturo Estrada Hernández, Mexican painter
Carla Estrada, Mexican producer
Chuck Estrada, American former Major League Baseball player
Daniel Estrada (disambiguation)
David Estrada (boxer), Guatemalan/Mexican-American professional boxer
David Estrada (soccer), American soccer player
Elise Estrada, Canadian singer
Enrique Estrada, Mexican General and politician
Erik Estrada, American actor, Reserve police officer
Genaro Estrada (1887–1937), Mexican statesman and writer
Horacio Estrada, Venezuelan former Major League Baseball player
Inah De Belen Estrada, Filipina actress, model, and daughter of John Estrada
Jade Esteban Estrada, American actor
Jeremiah Estrada, American baseball player
John Estrada, Filipino model and actor
John L. Estrada, USMC, Sergeant Major of the Marine Corps
Johnny Estrada, American former Major League Baseball player
Joseph Estrada, actually Jose M. Ejercito, actor, former President of the Philippines
Juan Alberto Estrada, Argentine football goalkeeper
Juan José Estrada, former President of Nicaragua
Juan José Estrada (boxer), Mexican
Marco René Estrada, Mexican-American Major League Baseball player
Marco Estrada, Chilean footballer
María Estrada (c. 1475 or 1486 – between 1537–48),  woman who accompanied Cortés in his expedition to Mexico
Mario Lopez Estrada, Guatemalan billionaire businessman
Miguel Estrada (born 1961), unsuccessful nominee to the US Court of Appeals for the District of Columbia Circuit
Miriam Estrada-Castillo, international law professor
Natalia Estrada, Spanish model, actress & TV presenter
Noel Estrada, Puerto Rican composer
Oscar Estrada, former Major League Baseball player
Roy Estrada, American bassist
Susana Estrada (born 1950), Spanish actress, vedette, and singer
Thairo Estrada (born 1996), Venezuelan  Major League Baseball player for the San Francisco Giants
Walter Estrada, Colombian professional boxer
Walter Estrada Degrandi (1930–2007), Uruguayan chess master

See also
Leonardo Astrada (born 1970), retired Argentine footballer
A Estrada, a municipality in Pontevedra province, Galicia, Spain

References

Spanish-language surnames